Stefano Grazzini (born 18 December 1952) is a former Italian male long-distance runner who competed at one edition of the IAAF World Cross Country Championships at senior level (1975),

References

External links
 Stefano Grazzini profile at Association of Road Racing Statisticians

1952 births
Living people
Italian male long-distance runners
Italian male cross country runners